Luiz Mattar was the defending champion and won in the final 7–6, 6–4 against Jimmy Brown.

Seeds
A champion seed is indicated in bold text while text in italics indicates the round in which that seed was eliminated.

  Luiz Mattar (champion)
  Lawson Duncan (first round)
  Jaime Yzaga (semifinals)
  Cássio Motta (quarterfinals)
  Javier Frana (first round)
  Eduardo Bengoechea (quarterfinals)
  Todd Witsken (quarterfinals)
  Danilo Marcelino (semifinals)

Draw

External links
 1989 Guarujá Open Draw

1989 Grand Prix (tennis)